Ifor Williams Trailers is the United Kingdom's largest manufacturer of trailers under , based in Corwen, Denbighshire, North Wales.

History 
Started in 1958 by local farmer Ifor Williams, an on-site galvanizing plant gives the company total control over quality and efficiency in the production of chassis and other assemblies. The company employs approximately 800 people across six sites in Clawdd Poncen, Cynwyd, Ruthin, Deeside and Sandycroft, Flintshire. During the Great Recession, 63 employees were made redundant in late 2008.

Production was affected by fire on two occasions. The first, on 28 August 2012, caused severe damage to the company's Deeside plant. The second, on 14 September 2017, was limited to machinery at the Clawdd Poncen site.

Sales 

Their main showroom is located in the former Corwen railway station. Product distribution is handled by over fifty main dealers in the UK, with 25% of total sales going for export via independent distributors across Europe.

Sponsorship of Wrexham Football Club 

In June 2016, Ifor Williams became the main kit sponsor of Wrexham Football Club. The kit launch was held at the Urdd National Eisteddfod in Flint.

In 2020 actors Ryan Reynolds and Rob McElhenney created an advert for the company as part of their purchase application for Wrexham Football Club.

On 30 June 2021, Wrexham's announced that Chinese social media company TikTok will be the club's new shirt sponsor for the 2021-22 campaign. Ifor Williams will now become the shorts sponsor.

References

External links
Company website

Manufacturing companies established in 1958
Denbighshire
Manufacturing companies of Wales
Trailer manufacturing companies
1958 establishments in Wales